Sarthal is a region in Kishtwar district of Jammu and Kashmir (union territory), famous for Sarthal Devi Temple.

Sarthal Devi Temple

A Hindu shrine, Sarthal Mata is famous for annual pilgrimage known as Sarthal Yatra. The idol which is considered as re-incarnation of Goddess Durga, was originally carved from stones by locals during the period of Raja Agar Dev of Kishtwar and later, renovated by Maharaja Hari Singh in 1936.

References

Villages in Kishtwar district